Expecting Amish is a 2014 American television drama film produced and directed by Richard Gabai. It stars AJ Michalka, Jesse McCartney, Alyson Stoner, Cayden Boyd, Aurelia Scheppers, and Avery Kristen Pohl.

Cast
 AJ Michalka as Hannah Yoder
 Jesse McCartney as Josh
 Alyson Stoner as Mary
 Cayden Boyd as Isaac
 Aurelia Scheppers as Sarah
 Avery Kristen Pohl as Beth
 Jean-Luc Bilodeau as Samual
 Brian Krause as Mr. Yoder
 Ron Ely as Elder Miller
 Micah Tayloe Owens as Gabe
 Carrie Wampler as Jennifer

Release
The film premiered on Lifetime Network on July 19, 2014, by Check Entertainment.

References

American drama television films
2014 films
Films directed by Richard Gabai
Lifetime (TV network) films
2010s English-language films